USS Neches may refer to the following ships operated by the United States Navy:

 , a U.S. Navy fleet replenishment oiler; launched in 1920 and sunk by the Japanese, 23 January 1942
 , a U.S. Navy fleet replenishment oiler; launched in 1942 and scrapped in 1973
 , a tanker leased by the U.S. Navy; launched in 1971 and scrapped in 1983

United States Navy ship names